Homer Loring (1875-1939) was an American industrialist who served as chairman of the Boston & Maine Railroad from 1924 to 1928. He was known for reorganizing large industries.

Early life
Loring was born on October 1875 in Newton Center, Massachusetts. He attended Newton public schools. Loring began his business career with his father's brokerage firm.

Railroads
Loring served as president of the Macon, Dublin & Savannah Railroad, chairman of the Eastern Massachusetts Street Railway, and receiver of the Des Moines, Fort Dodge & Southern Railroad. He also worked for the Saginaw Traction Company and organized the Nevada Consolidated Copper Company.

Boston & Maine
On April 9, 1924, Loring was elected as a director of the Boston & Maine Railroad. On August 19, 1924, Loring was elected chairman of the B&M executive committee. During his tenure as chairman, the B&M built new freight classification yards, improved buildings, roadbeds, and bridges, installed new equipment, consolidated personnel, discontinued or transferred 300 miles of unremunerative lines, enlarged the Hoosac Tunnel, and developed a new North Station complex, which included a new train station, the Boston Garden, Hotel Manger, North Station Industrial Building, and a distributing terminal. Loring's financial reorganization brought $13 million of new funds to the railroad and extended the maturity of $40 million worth of bonds by fifteen years. He also installed George Hannauer as president and brought on John Frank Stevens as an advisor. Loring resigned as chairman on September 24, 1928.

Administration and Finance
In December 1922, Governor Channing H. Cox nominated Loring to serve on the newly created State Commission on Administration and Finance. Loring was the commission's chairman as well as the budget commissioner. He resigned in September 1924 to fully devote his time to his duties as B&M chairman.

Textiles
In October 1928, Loring and associates bought into the Seneca Textile Corporation of New York. On October 9, 1928, Loring announced the formation of the United Merchants and Manufacturers, Inc. Loring served a president of the new company. In January 1929, Loring purchased the Arkwright Mills in Fall River, Massachusetts.

Personal life
Loring was married to Mary (Bennett) Loring. The couple had one daughter. In 1908, Loring purchased Maple Ridge Farm in Ashland, Massachusetts for use as a summer place. On January 25, 1925, the mansion house was destroyed by a suspected arson fire. All of the mansion's valuables were destroyed. In 1936, Loring began residing in a room at The Union League Club in New York City.

Loring died on June 20, 1939 in his room at The Union League Club. He was buried in the Lakeview Cemetery in Holliston, Massachusetts.

References

1875 births
1939 deaths
20th-century American railroad executives
American textile industry businesspeople
Boston and Maine Railroad
People from Ashland, Massachusetts
People from Murray Hill, Manhattan
People from Newton, Massachusetts